Silver(II) fluoride is a chemical compound with the formula AgF2.  It is a rare example of a silver(II) compound.  Silver usually exists in its +1 oxidation state.  It is used as a fluorinating agent.

Preparation
AgF2 can be synthesized by fluorinating Ag2O with elemental fluorine.  Also, at 200 °C (473 K) elemental fluorine will react with AgF or AgCl to produce AgF2.

As a strong fluorinating agent, AgF2 should be stored in Teflon or a passivated metal container.  It is light sensitive.

AgF2 can be purchased from various suppliers, the demand being less than 100 kg/year.  While laboratory experiments find use for AgF2, it is too expensive for large scale industry use. In 1993, AgF2 cost between 1000-1400 US dollars per kg.

Composition and structure
AgF2 is a white crystalline powder, but it is usually black/brown due to impurities.  The F/Ag ratio for most samples is < 2, typically approaching 1.75 due to contamination with Ag and oxides and carbon.

For some time, it was doubted that silver was actually in the +2 oxidation state, rather than some combination of states such as AgI[AgIIIF4], which would be similar to silver(I,III) oxide. Neutron diffraction studies, however, confirmed its description as silver(II). The AgI[AgIIIF4] was found to be present at high temperatures, but it was unstable with respect to AgF2.

In the gas phase, AgF2 is believed to have D∞h symmetry.

Approximately 14 kcal/mol (59 kJ/mol) separate the ground and first excited states.  The compound is paramagnetic, but it becomes ferromagnetic at temperatures below −110 °C (163 K).

Uses
AgF2 is a strong fluorinating and oxidising agent. It is formed as an intermediate in the catalysis of gaseous reactions with fluorine by silver.

It is used in the fluorination and preparation of organic perfluorocompounds. This type of reaction can occur in three different ways (here Z refers to any element or group attached to carbon, X is a halogen):
 CZ3H  +  2 AgF2  →  CZ3F + HF  +  2 AgF
 CZ3X  +  2AgF2  → CZ3F + X2  +  2 AgF
 Z2C=CZ2  +  2 AgF2  →  Z2CFCFZ2  +  2 AgF
Similar transformations can also be effected using other high valence metallic fluorides such as CoF3, MnF3, CeF4, and PbF4.

 is also used in the fluorination of aromatic compounds, although selective monofluorinations are more difficult:

C6H6  +  2 AgF2  →  C6H5F  +  2 AgF  +  HF

 oxidises xenon to xenon difluoride in anhydrous HF solutions.

2 AgF2 + Xe → 2 AgF + XeF2

It also oxidises carbon monoxide to carbonyl fluoride.

2 AgF2 + CO → 2 AgF + COF2

It reacts with water to form oxygen gas:

4 AgF2 + 4 H2O → 2 Ag2O + 8 HF + O2

 can be used to selectively fluorinate pyridine at the ortho position under mild conditions.

Safety
 is a very strong oxidizer that reacts violently with water, reacts with dilute acids to produce ozone, oxidizes iodide to iodine, and upon contact with acetylene forms the contact explosive silver acetylide. It is light-sensitive, very hygroscopic and corrosive. It decomposes violently on contact with hydrogen peroxide, releasing oxygen gas. It also liberates HF, and elemental silver.

References

External links

National Pollutant Inventory Fluoride and compounds fact sheet
WebElements Silver(II) Fluoride
Structure graphic

Fluorides
Silver compounds
Metal halides
Fluorinating agents